Bakra is a village located in Jalore district in the state of Rajasthan, India. It had an estimated population of 5,953 at the 2011 Census.

References

External links
 Villageinfo.in page

Villages in Jalore district